Francesco Quintini (born May 27, 1952) is an Italian former professional footballer who played as a goalkeeper.

He made nine appearances in Serie A for A.S. Roma spread over six seasons.

Honours
 Anglo-Italian Cup winner: 1972

References

1952 births
Living people
Footballers from Rome
Italian footballers
Association football goalkeepers
A.S. Roma players
Serie A players